Wilfried Cretskens (born 10 July 1976) is a Belgian former road bicycle racer. He rode most of his career for the  team, where he was a domestique for the team leaders in the classic races, among others Tom Boonen. His most notable career win was the 2007 Tour of Qatar.

Major results

1993
1st Tour of Flanders Juniors
1999
3rd Nokere Koerse
5th Le Samyn
6th Overall Circuit de Lorraine
1st Stage 6
8th Brussel-Ingooigem
2001
2nd Omloop van het Waasland
6th Grand Prix de Rennes
10th Grote Prijs Jef Scherens
2003
9th Nationale Sluitingsprijs
2004
10th Tour de Rijke
2005
8th GP Rudy Dhaenens
2007
1st  Overall Tour of Qatar
7th GP Briek Schotte
2008
9th Overall Tour of Qatar

Tour de France participations 
 2005: DNF
 2006: DNF

Personal life 
Cretskens was born in Herk-de-Stad.

External links

Belgian male cyclists
1976 births
Living people
Cyclists from Limburg (Belgium)
People from Herk-de-Stad